Fountain pen ink is a water-based ink intended for use with fountain pens.

Composition 

Fountain pen ink is almost exclusively dye-based because fountain pens operate on the principle of capillary action. Pigment-based inks (which contain solid pigment particles in a liquid suspension) tend to clog the narrow passages of the pen. India ink, a carbon pigment-based ink, also contains a binder, gum arabic, which can quickly clog such pens. Some pigmented inks do exist for fountain pens, but these nanoparticle inks use pigments that are very finely ground to reduce the chance of clogging. They have the advantage of being waterproof and are used by artists who want to draw lines that won't be affected by a watercolour wash.

The ideal fountain pen ink is free-flowing, free of sediment, and non-corrosive. These qualities may be compromised in the interests of permanence, manufacturability and in order to use some widely available dyes.

A form of ink that predates fountain pens by centuries is iron gall ink. This blue-black ink is made from iron salts and tannic acid from vegetable sources. Prior to the ready availability of manufactured ink, iron gall ink was often homemade. Stark's ink was one iron gall ink recipe, named after the Scottish chemist who devised it after spending several decades experimenting with hundreds of formulations.

Iron gall ink was used in fountain pens when they were invented but has the disadvantage of causing corrosion to metal parts. Modern formulations of iron gall ink are somewhat less corrosive and are still occasionally used in applications that require permanence.

Red inks usually contain the dye eosin. Blue inks often contain triarylmethane dye. Black inks are mixtures. In addition to water, the non-dye components (collectively referred to as the vehicle) might include polymeric resins, humectants to retard premature drying, pH modifiers, anti-foaming agents, biocides to prevent fungal and bacterial growth, and wetting agents (surfactants). Surfactants reduce the surface tension of the ink; distilled water has a surface tension of 72 dyn/cm (72 × 10−3 N/m), but the desirable value for ink is between 38 and 45 dyn/cm (38 to 45 × 10−3 N/m). If the ink's surface tension were too high, then it would not flow through the pen; if it were too low, then the ink would run out of the pen with less control.

Some users mix inks to create their own colours. Some combinations of inks may cause unexpected colour changes, even if the inks are from the same manufacturer. This is a result of chemical reactions between the different components. The colour of many dyes depends on pH, and some lose their colour entirely outside a certain pH range. Mixing inks may also alter the solubility of some dye components; for example, an alcohol-based ink may contain components that are insoluble in water, and these will precipitate or coagulate if the alcohol-based ink is mixed with a water-based ink.

Delivery 

Fountain pens carry ink within the barrel, traditionally either inserted at one end in bulk with a syringe or eyedropper pipette, or through a mechanical filling system built into the pen (such as a piston or vacuum-pump mechanism). For such fountain pens, ink is available in bottles which will typically refill an individual pen many tens of times.  Simpler fountain pens use pre-filled ink cartridges, although in many cases the cartridge can be replaced with a converter which replicates the mechanical filling action of more expensive pens.  The cost per millilitre of ink tends to be lower for bottled ink than for cartridges, while cartridges can be simpler to use.

Care must be taken when using some vintage pens manufactured from celluloid, as this material can become stained by long-term exposure to some inks.

Manufacturers 

Most fountain pen manufacturers also provide a brand of ink. For example, Parker sells "Quink", Pilot sells "Iroshizuku", Wancher sells "Silk Road", and Sheaffer sells "Skrip", while manufacturers like Waterman, Lamy, Hero, Pelikan, Birmingham Pen Company, Thornton's Luxury Goods, Kaweco, Koh-i-Noor, Montegrappa and Montblanc sell ink under the same branding as their fountain pens. 

The recent resurgence in fountain pen use has also created a market for companies that specialize in ink, such as the British company Diamine, the German company De Atramentis, and American companies such as Private Reserve Ink and Noodler's Ink. These companies manufacture ink in dozens of different colours. Some companies that specialize in ink, like Noodler's and Private Reserve Ink, have also created ink with special properties, like glow in the dark, waterproofing, highlighting and indestructible (document) inks.

Durability and security 

In the late 20th century, particular attention has been paid by ink manufacturers to the durability of their products against the effects of time, light, moisture, and efforts at forgery or falsification (see Check washing). Some of these inks use pigments – the solid pigment particles lodge between the cellulose fibers that make up the paper and are unaffected by attempts to remove them with solvents. Other inks use dyes that chemically bond with the paper's cellulose, and which likewise resist removal by solvents. A disadvantage of the dye inks is that, if spilled, they will form irremovable stains on clothing made from cotton, which also contains cellulose. Also, some "secure" inks are vulnerable to removal using powerful infra-red lasers.

References 

Inks